Committee on International Relations may refer to:

 an earlier name for the United States House Committee on Foreign Affairs
 Committee on International Relations (University of Chicago), a university graduate programme

See also
 Portfolio Committee on International Relations and Cooperation
 Council on Foreign Relations
 European Council on Foreign Relations